Nashirabad is a small town in Jalgaon district in the northern Maharashtra state in India. It was named after Nasiruddin Badshah. The earlier name of the town was Solnimbhore. This was due to fact that the town had 16 Hanuman temples and 16 main doors.

Demographics and economy 
The population includes Wani, Brahmins, Leva Patil, Mali, and Teli, who run many businesses. The main business is the farming of banana trees and sugar cane. 

Nashirabad is on National Highway No. 6 (Surat-Kolkata National Highway) and has many warehouses of local products.

Transport 
Most people depend on public transport (MSRTC), commonly known as "ST", and private hire vehicles like auto-rickshaw for commuting to and from district and taluka places like Jalgaon and Bhusawal. All the MSRTC buses except express bus services stop at Nashirabad bus stand. The nearest bus depots are at Jalgaon and Bhusawal.

Nearest railway stations are:
 Bhadli 2.5 km (halt for passenger trains only)
 Jalgaon 10 km (express and passenger halt)
 Bhusawal 16 km (all trains halt)

Religion

Temples 
 Shri Vishnu Mandir Devasthan was established in 1725. This temple had been situated at Nashirabad since the time of Pesheve. Shri Vishnu Mandir Devasthan was built as per direction of Honorary Magistrate Kai. Amrutrao Deshpande.
 Shri. Ganpati Mandir Mandir, Indira Chowk,
 Vitthal Mandir - at Down Lane, Holi Maidan
 Balabhim Vyayamshala
 Anna Maharaj Math
 Sawata Maharaj Manidr - Upper Lane
 Ram Mandir
 Bavani Mandir
 Mukteshwar Mandir
 Mahalakshmi Mandir
 Ganpati Mandir (Tarsod 2.5 km from village)
 Neemjay Mata Bhavani's Mandir
 Dnyaneshwar maharaj mandir.
 Shree Krishna Mandir
 Ram Peth
 Ganpati Mandir (Nashirabad)
 Indira Gandhi Chowk
 Marimata Mandir (Ravindra Bhagvan Javre)
 Anna maharaj Mandir, near Grampanchayat
 Mahalaxmi Mandir
 Mhasoba dev sthan

Mosques 
 Jaama Masjid - Emam Ahmad Raza Road
 Sunni Kaali Masjid - Choupal Mohalla
 Mirzaani Masjid - Haidar Ali Mohalla
 Peer Shahabuddin Masjid - Emam Ahmad Raza road
 Momin Masjid -Momin mohalla upras 
 Momin Masjid - Rehmatpura 
 Abu Bakar Masjid - Manyar Mohalla
 Khwaja Masjid - Khwaja Garib Nawaz Nagar
 Khatoon-e-Jannat Masjid - Taaj Nagar

Areas 
 Varchi Aali (Upper Lane) Varchi Ali Area - Most people of Mali, and the most people Muslim Manyar and Maratha Samaj. The oldest temples of Shree Sant Sawatha Mali Maharaj and Shri Datta Mandir are attractive temples in the area. The area is divided as Patil wada, Naik Vada, Mahajan Wada, Ganpat Dula Wada, Varcha Wada, Mari Mata Wada and Sant Sawatha Mali Nagar.
 Madhli Aali (Middle Lane) Saati Bazar, Ram Peth, Ram Mandir, Isane Wada, Sadaphale Wada.
 Khalchi Aali (Down Lane) - Most Case As Leva Patidar and his Occupation Farming, The area includes chaudhari wada, bajar patta, holi maiden, and dabepur wada.

References 

Cities and towns in Jalgaon district